Luisa Adorno, pseudonym of Mila Curradi (2 August 1921 – 12 July 2021) was an Italian writer and teacher.

Biography
Adorno spent her career as a secondary school teacher. In 2005, she was a judge for the Premio Brancati.

In 1963, Adorno was awarded the Premio Alpi Apuane. In 1999, a collection of her works was housed in the Archivio di Stato di Firenze, where it remains to this day. That same year, she was awarded the Premio Vittorini for Sebben che siamo donne. In 2001, she became a Grand Officer of the Order of Merit of the Italian Republic.

Luisa Adorno died in Rome on 12 July 2021 at the age of 99.

Distinctions
Grand Officer of the Order of Merit of the Italian Republic (2001)

Works
L'ultima provincia (1983)
Le dorate stanze (1985)
Arco di luminara (1990)
La libertà ha un cappello a cilindro (1993)
Come a un ballo in maschera (1995)
Sebben che siamo donne (1999)
Foglia d'acero (2001)
Tutti qui con me (2008)
Italia mia (2010)

References

1921 births
2021 deaths
20th-century Italian writers
Italian educators
People from Pisa
Grand Officers of the Order of Merit of the Italian Republic
20th-century pseudonymous writers
Pseudonymous women writers
20th-century Italian women writers